Howard DeVore (May 26, 1925 – December 31, 2005) was an American archivist, science fiction collector, dealer, expert on pulp magazines, APA and fanzine writer, con-runner and active volunteer in science fiction fandom.

As a nonfiction author, he was a Hugo Award nominee for Best Related Book in 1999 for his directory, Hugo, Nebula & World Fantasy Awards.

Starting in about 1938, DeVore accumulated an extensive collection of fannish culture and science fiction-related artifacts and publications. In his later years, as his health was in decline, he donated original and electronic copies of much of his collection to various science fiction-themed archives.

Young "Howie", as his flight jacket proclaims, was a ball turret gunner on a B-17 Flying Fortress, flying wartime bomb runs over France with the 8th Air Force.

Role in fandom
Active member of N3F and First Fandom.

1948-1980 Member of Michigan Science-Fantasy Society (MSFS), The Misfits, (picking a date for the end of MSFS is difficult, as the group slowly mutated from active fanac to a bowling league).

1950-2005 Attended every single Midwestcon since its inception.  His wake was held at Midwestcon.

1952-2005 Active member and sometime official editor (OE) of the Spectator Amateur Press Society (SAPS), an Amateur press association.  Also an active member of the Fantasy Amateur Press Association (FAPA) and the Pulp Era Amateur Press Society (PEAPS).

1959 Worldcon, Detention. Concom, head of publicity.  "There will be a Worldcon in Detroit over my dead body."

1966 Worldcon, Tricon, a joint bid by Cleveland (where it was held), Detroit, and Cincinnati.  Howard was associate chairman for Detroit.

1966-1968 one of the founders of Marcon. Fan Guest of Honor in 1975.

1971 Fan Guest of Honor at Lunacon.

1974 Fan Guest of Honor at A2 Relax-I-Con, the zeroth &/or 1st ConFusion (convention).  Also Toastmaster in 1999.

1990 Fan Guest of Honor at Windycon.

1996 Fan Guest of Honor at Kubla Khan in Nashville.

2000-2005 Director at Large, Science Fiction Oral History Association.

2004 Inducted into the Detroit Science Fiction Hall of Fame at ConFusion (convention).

2006 Fan Guest of Honor (posthumous) at the 64th World Science Fiction Convention, in Los Angeles, California.  His memory was honored at the convention.  Several members of his family attended the convention in his honor, and they were recognized during the events.

Family

Howard had three daughters with his wife, Sybil: Cheryl (1944), Karol (1952), and Suzanne (1954).

He had five grandchildren: Julie (1966), Ian (1982), Jesse (1985), Sarah (1986), and Jillian (1986), as well as two great-grandchildren: Casey and James.

References
 The Hugo, Nebula and World Fantasy Awards , Howard DeVore (1998).

External links
 Live Journal Biography
 L.A. Con IV page about DeVore
 "A Little Piece of my Heart: Remembering Howard DeVore", by Earl Kemp, eI24
 "Grandfather Stories", by Chad Childers, for the ConFusion one-shot

 

1925 births
2005 deaths
American science fiction writers
Writers from Michigan
20th-century American writers
20th-century American male writers
United States Army Air Forces personnel of World War II
United States Army Air Forces soldiers